In the years running up to the 2008 Italian general election, various organisations carried out opinion polls to gauge voting intention in Italy. Results of such polls are given in this article. Poll results are reported at the dates when the fieldwork was done, as opposed to the date of publication; if such date is unknown, the date of publication is given instead. Under the Italian par condicio (equal conditions) law, publication of opinion polls is forbidden in the last two weeks of an electoral campaign.

Party vote

Graphical summary

2008

2007

2006

References

2008
Italy